Melissia is a village in Achaea, Greece, part of the municipal unit of Aigio. It is located 8 km south of Aigio, near the right bank of the river Selinountas. Melissia had a 2011 population of 317 for the village and 343 for the community, which includes the villages Lakka and Pyrgaki. Melissia suffered damage from the July 2007 forest fires.

Population

External links
 Melissia GTP Travel Pages

See also

List of settlements in Achaea

References

Aigialeia
Aigio
Populated places in Achaea